Diogo Gouveia Miranda, known as Diogo Gouveia (born 25 January 1995) is a Portuguese footballer who plays for União de Lamas as a midfielder.

Football career
On 25 October 2014, Gouveia made his professional debut with Boavista in a 2014–15 Primeira Liga match against Paços Ferreira.

References

External links

Stats and profile at LPFP 

Diogo Gouveia at ZeroZero

1995 births
Sportspeople from Santa Maria da Feira
Living people
Portuguese footballers
Association football midfielders
Portuguese expatriate footballers
C.D. Feirense players
Boavista F.C. players
C.D. Mafra players
SC São João de Ver players
R.D. Águeda players
C.F. União de Lamas players
Primeira Liga players
Liga Portugal 2 players
A Lyga players
Expatriate footballers in Lithuania
Portuguese expatriate sportspeople in Lithuania